The seventh and final season of the HBO supernatural drama series True Blood premiered on June 22, 2014 and contained ten episodes. The season was ordered on July 15, 2013. At the beginning of September it was announced that it would be the final season. The season was preceded by a farewell special titled "Farewell to Bon Temps", in which executive producers Alan Ball and Brian Buckner united with various cast members to reminisce about the series and gave a special preview of the final season.

Cast and characters

Main cast 

 Anna Paquin as Sookie Stackhouse
 Stephen Moyer as Bill Compton
 Sam Trammell as Sam Merlotte
 Ryan Kwanten as Jason Stackhouse
 Rutina Wesley as Tara Thornton
 Alexander Skarsgård as Eric Northman 
 Chris Bauer as Andy Bellefleur
 Kristin Bauer van Straten as Pam Swynford De Beaufort
 Amelia Rose Blaire as Willa Burrell
 Lauren Bowles as Holly Cleary
 Tara Buck as Ginger
 Anna Camp as Sarah Newlin
 Gregg Daniel as Reverend Daniels
 Nelsan Ellis as Lafayette Reynolds
 Aaron Christian Howles as Rocky Cleary
 Joe Manganiello as Alcide Herveaux
 Noah Matthews as Wade Cleary
 Bailey Noble as Adilyn Bellefleur
 Jim Parrack as Hoyt Fortenberry
 Nathan Parsons as James Kent
 Adina Porter as Lettie Mae Daniels
 Carrie Preston as Arlene Fowler Bellefleur
 Jurnee Smollett-Bell as Nicole Wright
 Deborah Ann Woll as Jessica Hamby
 Karolina Wydra as Violet Mazurski

Special guest cast

 Robert Patrick as Jackson Herveaux
 Michael McMillian as Steve Newlin
 Jessica Tuck as Nan Flanagan
 Todd Lowe as Terry Bellefleur
 Rutger Hauer as Niall Brigant
 Lois Smith as Adele Stackhouse

Guest cast 

 Patricia Bethune as Jane Bodehouse
 Tanya Wright as Deputy Kenya Jones
 Riley Smith as Keith
 Will Yun Lee as Mr. Gus
 John Rezig as Deputy Kevin Ellis
 Tess Alexandra Parker as Rosie
 Brett Rickaby as Vince McNeil
 Paula Jai Parker as Karen
 Dustin Ingram as Ronnie
 Shannon Lucio as Caroline Compton
 Ashley Hinshaw as Brigette
 Isabella Rice as Sarah Compton
 Dale Raoul as Maxine Fortenberry
 Robert Baker as Mack
 Lucas Adams as Lou
 Eugene Byrd as Jerome
 Brianne Davis as Belinda
 Chelsea Ricketts as Lucinda
 Natalie Hall as Amber Mills
 John W. Godley as Big John Dickson
 Brian Poth as Matt
 Stacy Haiduk as Jenny
 Louis Ozawa Changchien as Hiroki
 Shishir Kurup as Guru Sanbir Dutta
 Gilbert Uwuor as Minus
 Matthew Holmes as Charles Dupont
 Paul Rae as Dark Figure
 Maz Jobrani as Moroccan Proprietor
 David Bickford as Reverend Skinner
 Arthur Darbinyan as Najat
 Massi Furlan as Nizar
 Lily Knight as Betty Harris
 Gabriella Wright as Sylvie
 Drew Rausch as Julian Fortenberry
 Željko Ivanek as The Magister
 Christian Pitre as Victoria
 Jamie Luner as Amanda
 Bess Armstrong as Nancy Mills
 Brett Rice as Paul Mills
 Kathleen York as Madeline Kapnek
 Michael Rothhaar as William Compton Sr.
 Marcia de Rousse as Dr. Ludwig
 Malcolm Goodwin as Joe Thornton

Episodes

Ratings

Production 
A seventh season was ordered on July 15, 2013, and was later announced to be the final season. Brian Buckner continued as executive producer and showrunner.

At the end of December 2013, actor Luke Grimes, who had portrayed the vampire James in the sixth season, asked to be released from his contract over creative differences (according to cast and crew Grimes didn't want to play the role once he found out his character was going to be bisexual in season seven). Australian actor Nathan Parsons was later announced as his replacement. After having recurring roles as Ginger and Lettie Mae Thornton since the first season, both Tara Buck and Adina Porter were promoted to series regulars.

Filming on the final episode wrapped in the early hours of July 10, 2014. Charlaine Harris, author of the series of novels on which the show is based, filmed a cameo for the series finale (she was director for Eric and Pam's commercial).

References

External links 
 
 

2014 American television seasons
True Blood